The Cameroonian passport is issued to citizens of Cameroon for international travel.

As a member of the Central African Monetary Zone, Cameroonian passports are engraved with a CEMAC symbol on the cover page. Holders of Cameroonian passports can travel to other CEMAC countries without any visa.

, Cameroonian citizens had visa-free or visa on arrival access to 45 countries and territories, ranking the Cameroonian passport 90th in terms of travel freedom (tied with Angolan and Vietnamese passports) according to the Henley visa restrictions index.

See also
 List of passports
 Visa requirements for Cameroonian citizens

References

Cameroon
Politics of Cameroon